American School Hong Kong (ASHK) is a co-educational American international school located at 6 Ma Chung Road, in Tai Po, New Territories, Hong Kong. It is owned and operated by Esol Education and enrolled its first students in August 2016. It offers classes in elementary, middle school and high school, through to Grade 12(will open next school year). Its Grade 9 class opens in August 2019, grade 10 opened in 2020 and grade 11 opened in 2021 with a new fifth floor.

ASHK delivers an American education program, adapted for the local and international student body in Hong Kong.

Background 
In a 2014 school allocation exercise organized by the Hong Kong Government, Esol Education was one of five successful groups amongst 46 who submitted bids for new international school site licences. Esol was assigned the former Buddhist Hui Yuan College in Tai Po.

The seven story, 12,000 m2 facility was built in 1992. In 2004, a new wing was added. In 2012, Buddhist Hui Yuan College was closed due to declining enrolment. Esol Education retrofitted the entire exterior and interior of the building. In addition to providing all new floors, ceilings, walls, plumbing, electrical, millwork, etc., Esol also refitted the premises to increase multi-purpose space, added learning technology capabilities, and altered the Science and specialty areas to bring them in line with curriculum plans and the current pedagogical approach to teaching and learning.

Accreditations 
ASHK is fully accredited for grades KG-11 by the Accrediting Commission for Schools, Western Association of Schools and Colleges, and the Middle States Association of Schools and Colleges. ASHK is also an IB World School, authorized to offer the IB Diploma Programme (IBDP) in Grades 11 and 12.

Extracurricular activities 
Activities for students include sports, arts, service learning, clubs and leadership. ASHK students can participate in various field trips around Hong Kong as well as abroad for middle school students, and overnight camp for Grade 4 and 5 students.

ASHK is a member of the International Schools Sports Federation Hong Kong (ISSFHK) and got a bronze medal at 2020-2021 school year.

Scholarship Program 
The school's scholarship program allows students an equal opportunity to enjoy an educational experience with financial assistance.

References

External links
 American School Hong Kong
Esol Education
United States Common Core Standards

American international schools in Hong Kong
Educational institutions established in 2016
Tai Po
Primary schools in Hong Kong
Secondary schools in Hong Kong
2016 establishments in Hong Kong